John Lucas may refer to:

Politicians
John Lucas (Australian politician) (1818–1902), Australian politician in New South Wales
John Lucas (MP for Colchester) (by 1512–1556), MP for Colchester
John Lucas (MP for Gloucester), Member of Parliament in 1311
John Baptiste Charles Lucas (1758–1842), US congressman from Pennsylvania
John G. Lucas (1864–1944), African-American lawyer and politician

Sports
John Lucas II (born 1953), American professional basketball player and head coach
John Lucas III (born 1982), American professional basketball player and assistant coach
John Lucas (cricketer) (1922–2008), West Indian and Canadian cricketer
John Lucas (footballer) (1869–1953), Australian rules footballer for Geelong
Jack Lucas (footballer) (John Lucas, born 1961), Australian rules footballer for Sydney
Johnny Lucas (baseball) (1903–1970), backup outfielder
Johnny Lucas (canoeist) (1931–1993), Luxembourgian sprint canoer

Military
John Lucas (British Army officer) (1921–2013), British soldier with the Chindits
John Lucas (VC) (1826–1892), Irish recipient of the Victoria Cross
John P. Lucas (1890–1949), American general in World War II

Others
John Lucas, 1st Baron Lucas of Shenfield (1606–1671), English Royalist soldier, industrialist and landowner
John Lucas (comics), American comic book artist
John Lucas (historian) (1684–1750), historian of Warton, Lancashire, England
John Lucas (painter) (1807–1874), English artist
John Lucas (philosopher) (1929–2020), British philosopher
John Lucas (poet) (born 1937), British poet, critic, travel writer, literary historian, anthologist and publisher
John Lucas (priest) (1921–1992), Archdeacon of Totnes
John Meredyth Lucas (1919–2002), American screenwriter and director
John Seymour Lucas (1849–1923), Victorian English historical and portrait painter

See also
Jon Lucas (born 1976), American screenwriter
Jon Lucas (actor) (born 1995), Filipino actor
St. John Lucas (1879–1934), English poet
Jonathan Lucas, Canadian official of the United Nations
John Lukacs (1924–2019), Hungarian-American historian
John R. Lukacs (born 1947), American anthropologist
John Lukas, American poker player
Jon Lukas (1948–2021), Maltese musician